Aryan religion may refer to:

Ancient Hinduism 
Historical Indian religions more generally Hinduism
The reconstructed Proto-Indo-Iranian religion
The reconstructed Proto-Indo-European religion
In early 20th century occultism, religions considered native to the "Aryan race", se Ariosophy